HMS E43 was a British E class submarine built by Swan Hunter, Wallsend. She was laid down on 22 December 1914 and was commissioned on 20 February 1916. E43 was sold on 3 January 1921 but became stranded under tow west off St Agnes Head, Cornwall on 25 November 1921.

Design
She was powered by two  Vickers eight-cylinder two-stroke diesel engines and two  electric motors.

E43 was armed with a 12-pounder  QF gun mounted forward of the conning tower. She had five 18 inch (450 mm) torpedo tubes, two in the bow, one either side amidships, and one in the stern; a total of 10 torpedoes were carried.

E-Class submarines had wireless systems with  power ratings; in some submarines, these were later upgraded to  systems by removing a midship torpedo tube. Their maximum design depth was  although in service some reached depths of below . Some submarines contained Fessenden oscillator systems.

Crew
Her complement was three officers and 28 men.

References

Bibliography
 

 

British E-class submarines of the Royal Navy
Ships built on the River Tyne
1915 ships
World War I submarines of the United Kingdom
Royal Navy ship names
Ships built by Swan Hunter
Maritime incidents in 1917
British submarine accidents